Jerzy Adam Gracjan Vetulani (21 January 1936 – 6 April 2017) was a Polish neuroscientist, pharmacologist and biochemist, professor of natural sciences, member of the Polish Academy of Sciences and the Polish Academy of Learning, one of the most frequently cited Polish scientists in the field of biomedicine after 1965.

Associated with the Institute of Pharmacology of the Polish Academy of Sciences in Kraków, at which he was a professor, head of the Department of Biochemistry (1976–2006), deputy director for Science Affairs (1994–2002) and vice chairman of the Scientific Council (2003–2017), he published more than 240 original research papers. He first gained recognition for an early hypothesis of the mechanism of action of antidepressant drugs, suggesting in 1975 together with Fridolin Sulser that downregulation of beta-adrenergic receptors is responsible for their effects. At the time, Vetulani was a Research Associate Professor at the Vanderbilt University (1973–1975). In 1983, he received Anna-Monika Prize for research on the mechanisms of the electroconvulsive therapy. Beside depression, his scientific interests included memory, addiction and neurodegeneration.

He was active in the field of popular science and became a recognizable science communicator in Poland. He headed the popular science magazine Wszechświat as its editor-in-chief (1981–2002), and was known for his popular lectures that gathered large audiences on various occasions. Since 2010 he ran a blog and social media channels, and authored several popular science books, some of which became bestsellers.

In the Polish People's Republic, he was active in the democratic opposition and became a member of the Solidarity in 1980. In 2002 he unsuccessfully ran for the presidency of Kraków. Throughout his life, he engaged in several cultural and social initiatives. In his twenties, he was an announcer at Piwnica pod Baranami cabaret (1954–1961), and in his seventies he became a performer in the live magazine Gadający Pies (The Talking Dog, 2010–2015).

He publicly argued for the legalization of marijuana and wide depenalization of drugs for adult users, severely criticizing repressive drug policy of Poland and other countries. He was an atheist.

An honorary fellow of Indian Academy of Neurosciences and Oxford Neurological Society, honorary doctor of the Medical University of Silesia and the Medical University of Łódź, he received numerous awards and state distinctions, including the Knight's Cross of Polonia Restituta.

Biography

1936–1952: Early years and rebellion

He was born on January 21, 1936 at the private gynecological hospital at Garncarska Street in Kraków, Poland as the son of Adam Vetulani, Professor and head of the Department of Church Law at the Jagiellonian University, and Irena Latinik, a biologist and daughter of Polish Army general Franciszek Latinik. In 1938 his younger brother Jan was born. The family occupied an apartment on the ground floor of the house of professors of the Jagiellonian University at Plac Inwalidów, employing a maid, cook and Olga Rutter, a child educator.

As Nazi Germany invaded Poland in September 1939, Adam Vetulani took part in the defense war. With his unit, he went to Romania and then to France, where he also fought on the front. Eventually he was interned in Switzerland, where he spent the rest of the war organizing school camps for Polish soldiers. The correspondence sent to the occupied Poland was signed by the Fraulein Kupfer alias.

After the German army entered Cracow, Irena Vetulani and her sons had to leave the apartment. They were given forty-eight hours to move, with the possibility of keeping movable property. They moved to the premises at Garncarska Street 4, where Józefa Onitsch, the wife of General Zygmunt Zieliński, gave them refuge. The family was supported by Adam Vetulani's brother, Tadeusz, who has been living in Cracow during the war. Thanks to her good knowledge of German, Irena took up her job as a translator in the spirit monopoly. Jerzy and Jan remained in war years under the care of the mother who raised both sons "in a patriotic sense of honor". Every Sunday at home there was a "mystery" and the family used to sing Polish Catholic patriotic song Boże, coś Polskę. In his childhood, Jerzy was a religious boy; he even served as an altar boy at St. Mary's Basilica.

Vetulani recalled the war years as interesting, full of fascinating activity and exploring the surrounding world, undermining the collective, martyrological picture of despair and misery. Together with his younger brother and friend from the tenement house, Andrzej Mirocki, they founded an insect gatherer club. For the most spectacular and precious part of their collection, they recognized a diverse collection of butterflies. Mother never let children witness one of the street executions.

Jerzy began his education in 1942 and immediately entered the second class of secret sets led by Mrs. Iwiczowa, as he was already able to read and write. From 1948 he attended the Henryk Sienkiewicz High School in Cracow, and then, after his liquidation, Bartłomiej Nowodworski High School, where he passed matura in 1952, obtaining a certificate with a distinction for best pupils.

Already as a teenager, Vetulani has completely walked away from religion. He described himself from a young age as "a rebel who did a lot of things in spite of his parents." At the age of twelve he enrolled in the Union of Polish Youth. He was removed from the organization as a result of a typo in the school newspaper article. In the text he mistakenly and unconsciously, instead of "the basis of socialism" (podstawy socjalizmu), he wrote "the washers of socialism" (podsrawy socjalizmu). Later he also joined the Atheists and Freethought Club. He belonged to the Revolutionary Youth Union, a formation of idealistic communists who were striving for reform of Polish communist system that they considered defective.

1952–1973: Studies, cabaret, Institute of Pharmacology 

In 1952 he began his studies in biology at the Jagiellonian University (specializing in animal physiology), which he completed in 1957, defending his thesis on the effects of ascorbic acid on rabbit blood. In March 1956, he began a volunteer internshipat at the Department of Pharmacology of the Polish Academy of Sciences (later renamed the Institute of Pharmacology), where he has been working since, until the end of his life. Janusz Supniewski was head of the department at that time. In 1957, after obtaining master's degree, Vetulani was hired as an assistant.

Later, also at the Jagiellonian University, he studied chemistry (specializing in theoretical chemistry). He graduated in 1963. As an exchange student he spent seven weeks in Swansea, where he worked at the British Iron and Steel Research Association. He rented a room at a senior Welsh marriage and studied English intensively; every day he bought an edition of Daily Mirror and underlined unknown words, that he later learned.

He was one of the founders and permanent regulars of the Piwnica pod Baranami cabaret. In the mid-1950s, together with a group of friends: Edmund Jarosz, Bronisław Chromy and Lala Skąpska, he took part in the demolition of the basement at Palace Pod Baranami, which soon became room for the cabaret. In 1958, when Piotr Skrzynecki left for Paris, Vetulani temporarily replaced him as a conference caller. It was in Piwnica that he met his future wife, Maria Pająk, whose appearance at the time he compared to Marina Vlady's. They married on 8 July 1963. Soon after that their sons Marek and Tomasz were born, respectively in 1964 and 1965. They also have four grandchildren.

In 1955–1962 he acted as a speaker at the Cracow Student Film Discussion Club. Vetulani admitted that "it was a good thing because "it taught him to speak short, interesting and fast". In 1972 he was a scientific consultant for the film Illumination directed by Krzysztof Zanussi.

After the death of his brother, who drowned during a canoeing on the Dunajec River in 1965, he mobilized to begin work on his Ph.D. dissertation. He obtained Ph.D. degree in natural sciences in 1966 from Ludwik Hirszfeld Institute of Immunology and Experimental Therapy of the Polish Academy of Sciences upon dissertation The action of isoxazole and pyrazole derivatives on the metabolism of the animal system prepared under the direction of Professor Józef Hano. In the same year went to Great Britain for one year Riker scholarship. In the UK he worked on mastering spectrofluorimetric methods at the University of Cambridge under the direction of Arnold Burgen. During his stay in Cambridge, he encountered Bożena Puchalska and Juliusz Hibner.

After returning to Poland he started work in the field of psychopharmacology under the direction of Jerzy Maj.

1973–1989: In the orbit of world science. Opposition 
After submitting a habilitation dissertation, he left to the United States for almost two years. There, he worked from 1973 to 1975 as Research Associate Professor at the Vanderbilt University. He gained international recognition after the discovery in 1975, with Fridolin Sulser, of β-downregulation by chronic administration of antidepressants and the formulation of β-downregulation hypothesis as a mechanism of action of antidepressants. The work on this subject, published by Vetulani and Sulser in Nature, became citation classic, receiving 580 vocations by 2007.

After his mother's death, he and his family decided to return to Poland. Vetulani received his habilitation degree in 1976 (upon work Neuroleptics, monoamine oxidase inhibitors and dopamine beta-hydroxylase inhibitors: their actions and synergies), an associate professor in 1983, and a professor in 1989. In 1976, he was appointed Head of the Department of Biochemistry at Institute of Pharmacology.

In the 1970s he translated several short stories by Ursula le Guin for magazine Przekrój. In Przekrój he also published short articles on his stay in the United States. Back in the 1960s he was offered regular work in Przekrój by its long-time editor-in-chief Marian Eile, but refused due to lack of possibility to combine scientific career with a full-time job as a columnist in a weekly.

Since 1978 he has regularly collaborated with the Consiglio Nazionale delle Ricerche (CNR, National Research Council) in Rome. On behalf of the Institute of Pharmacology of the Polish Academy of Sciences he was a coordinator of the joint research program of his home Institute with the Istituto di Biology Cellulare and Neurobiology (IBCN). When visiting Rome, he usually received an audience with John Paul II, who was a student of his father and friend of the family.

In 1983 Vetulani received International Anna-Monika Prize (2nd class) for his research on the mechanism of electroconvulsion. In years 1981–2002 he was the editor-in-chief of Wszechświat, one of the oldest Polish popular science magazines. He was also the editor-in-chief of the Polish Journal of Pharmacology and Pharmacy (1993–1996). He obtained the title of associate professor in 1983 and the title of full professor in 1989.

From 1980 he was an activist in the Solidarity movement. He was a member of the Solidarity Work Committee to the Department and Branches of the Polish Academy of Sciences in Kraków and was the 56th member of the Coordinating Commission for Science. In 1987–1989 he was a member of the Solidarity's Board of the Małopolska Region, at the end of that period, from 1989 to 1990 he was a member of the Presidium of the Board. He mainly dealt with programming matters and advised organization's authorities in the region. In the work for Solidarity he took advantage of the position of the editor-in-chief of a scientific magazine; during the martial law he smuggled a letter from Solidarity's region authorities from Poland to Vatican, where he passed it to pope John Paul II. He thought this smuggling was possible only because he wasn't searched, as a person at such an important position, and accompanied in his travel to Italy then by Mieczysław Czuma, editor-in-chief of Przekrój.

1989–2006: Late career and social activity 
Vetulani was a member of Solidarity Citizens' Committee (1989–1990) and Kraków Solidarity Club (1994–1995).

Between 1992 and 1998 he was a member of the Collegium Internationale Neuro-Psychopharmacologicum. In 1999–2001 he was the President of the Polish Neuroscience Society. He also introduced Polish term for neurofibrillary tangles, which he called splątki neurofibrylarne.

In 1991 he was appointed a correspondent member of the Polish Academy of Learning. He was appointed a full member in 1996. He regularly held meetings of the Scientific Cafe at the Polish Academy of Learning at Sławkowska Street 17, as the opening and moderator of the discussions. He was a member of the board of the Kraków Society of Friends of Fine Arts (2001–2017) and a member of the chapter of the Laurel of Kraków Award (also 2001–2017). He was a member of the board of the Society for the Advancement and Promotion of Science and member of the Warsaw Scientific Society and the European Dana Alliance for the Brain (EDAB). In 2002 he was appointed vice-chairman of the Scientific Council of the Insitiute of Pharmacology of the Polish Academy of Sciences.

In 2002 he was a founding member of the Forum for Małopolska Association and ran unsuccessfully for the presidency of the city of Kraków, obtaining 2375 votes (1.19%) in the first round of elections.

In 2008 he was elected a correspondent member of the Polish Academy of Sciences. Over the years, he held various functions in the academy's structures. He was the secretary of the Committee of Physiological Sciences (1978–1981), chair of the Neurobiology Committee (2007–2011), a member of the Scientific Council of the Institute of Experimental Biology (1993–2007) and the Institute of Experimental and Clinical Medicine (2003–2007) of the Polish Academy of Sciences.

2006–2017: Towards popular science 

In 2006, Vetulani left the position of head of the department of biochemistry of the Institute of Pharmacology of the Polish Academy of Sciences and devoted himself to a large degree to popular science. In this field he was active already in the 1960s when he published short texts in Wszechświat, as a rule signing articles with his own name or with pseudonym J. Latini. After 2000 he became known for his popular science lectures, which focused on themes connected with the functioning of human brain and the relationship between neuroscience and various social and cultural aspects. In 1999 he was a lecturer during the Cracow Brain Days, and since 2000 he has performed every year at the Cracow Brain Week organized as a part of World Brain Awareness Week.

Since June 2010 Vetulani ran a blog titled Piękno neurobiologii (The Beauty of Neuroscience) on WordPress. There, he published articles on discoveries in the fields of neuroscience and psychopharmacology and comments on the curiosities of the human brain and, additionally, various cultural and social matters. The direct cause of the founding of the site was the removal of Vetulani's column in Wprost magazine by the newly elected editor-in-chief Tomasz Lis. As the main motivator for blogging Vetulani has pointed the desire to share his own knowledge with others. In a 2011 interview he said, "Soon, what's in my brain will kick the bucket, so I have to try to pass on to others as much as I can.". He chose this form of sharing his texts because of the ability to reach wide group of readers, as well as because of the independence and freedom of content and deadlines. Since December 2011, he has also run a channel on YouTube, on which has published videos and records of his lectures. Vetulani published several popular articles on the topic of neuroscience, he has often given interviews for various magazines and appeared in the radio and television, becoming, especially in the last decade of his life, a celebrity in science.

After 1989 Vetulani politically sympathized with the center and the left. He has publicly supported specific candidats for public offices. In the 2010 presidential election in both rounds he supported Bronisław Komorowski and in the parliamentary election a year later Józef Lassota. In 2014 European Parliament election he supported Jan Hartman, expressing at the same time his solidarity with Róża Thun. Prior to the first round of presidential election in 2015, he supported Janusz Palikot. In the same year, in the parliamentary election he again supperted Lassota's candidature, congratulating him after obtaining a seat in the Sejm.

In the 2000s he lectured regularly at several colleges in Kraków. He was a Professor of the Małopolska Higher Vocational School of J. Dietl in Kraków, where he taught classes in cosmetology and dietetics (neurobiological aspect) and the School of Medicine in English at the Jagiellonian University Collegium Medicum. He also lectured at the Faculty of Applied Psychology at the Jagiellonian University and at the Pontifical University of John Paul II.

In 2010 he performed in a lip dub created by the community of Jagiellonian University. He appeared in its opening sequence as a grandfather of a little girl, the main character in the clip. Also from 2010 Vetulani regularly appeared on the stage of the talking magazine Gadający Pies (The Talking Dog), of which he became one of the main attractions and recognizable signs over time. One of the showrunners, Maciej Piotr Prus, described Vetulani as "the star of the first magnitude", adding that all participants were always waiting for his speeches. Vetulani compared the atmosphere of The Talking Dog to the ambience present in the beginnings of Piwnica pod Baranami. In his short presentations, the scientist used obscene humor and vulgarity, which some considered to be a violation of good taste, but most of the audience was enthusiastic to this kind of performance. In 2013 Vetulani performed and was the executive producer of the short film Hydrophobia, a mockumentary that ridiculed social phobias and premiered also at The Talking Dog. He co-created the performance Dreams Music directed by Czet Minkus, where he performed alongside Jan Peszek and Agata Zubel; the show was presented on December 19, 2013, in the Małopolska Garden of Art (MOS). In 2010 and 2015 Vetulani performed with Leszek Długosz with a concert program Rozumie mój (Oh, My Mind), in which poetry sung by Długosz was exchanged with Vetulani's neuroscience commentary. On December 31, 2014, he was appointed a member of the Program Board of the Station in Rome of the Polish Academy of Sciences.

Since 2014, he has been supporting auctions of the Great Orchestra of Christmas Charity; he devoted for auctions signed books and the opportunity to meet him at coffee or dinner. In 2015 and 2017 he was in the Honorary Committee of the Parada Równości (Equality Parade, pride parade held in Warsaw). Following the rule of Law and Justice party in Poland he sharply criticized their reforms, expressing his support for some of the actions undertaken by the Committee for the Defence of Democracy; he participated in the protest against taking over public media by the ruling party in January 2016, saying that although he found some parts of the protest "rather of primitive character", he "had the fantastic atmosphere of the event: in spite of the January chill – the crowds of old and young full of energy, each step you meet a friend (...). The event had both high civic and social value". Invited by students, he participated in the protest on the Main Market Square in Kraków in January 2017. He also supported Black Protest, what he manifested by simply wearing black clothes. In November 2016, an exhibition of photographs by Adam Golc from Vetulani's eightieth birthday party, that Vetulani organized in his home hosting at once around one hundred and eighty people, was opened at the Galeria Olympia. During Vetulani's party, Golec portrayed the guests in a specially prepared mini-studio, on the background painted by Iwona Siwek-Front.

Accident and death 
On March 2, 2017, in the evening, Vetulani, who was at the age of 81, was hit by an automobile at the pedestrian crossing receiving serious injuries. Vetulani was walking home from his regular place of work, the Institute of Pharmacology of the Polish Academy of Sciences, taking a route he knew very well. Directly after the accident he was put into a pharmacological coma, and his condition was determined as severe but stable. He was being treated at the Emergency Medicine Rescue and Disaster Center at the Szpital Uniwersytecki (University Hospital) in Kraków, under the supervision of the team of Professor Jerzy Wordliczek.

Vetulani's health, however, did not improve and he died in the hospital on April 6, 2017.

He was buried on April 18, 2017, in the Avenue of the Meritorious at the Rakowicki Cemetery in Kraków. Aleksander Janicki, visual artist and Vetulani's friend was the master of the ceremony which was carried out in a secular rite. Among the speakers at the funeral were Mayor of Kraków Jacek Majchrowski, president of the Polish Academy of Learning Andrzej Białas, Member of the Sejm Józef Lassota, and also friends and family of the late scientist.

His wife Maria Vetulani died few months later, on September 21, 2017.

Views 
As crucial in shaping his worldview, Vetulani pointed The Naked Ape by English zoologist Desmond Morris. He first came across Morris's work in Cambridge in 1967 and said: "Thanks to this book for the first time I saw that you could approach a man like a normal animal species. (...) I realized at that time how ridiculous is a man who, as an animal instead of on all fours, is walking on two legs. How funny we look, hairless almost all over the body. (...) I also got rid of the belief in the superuniqueness of Homo sapiens". Vetulani defined the source of happiness and fulfillment of life, considered from the perspective of biology, as the immortalization of one's own genes by passing them on to the next generations. He often referred to Theodosius Dobzhansky's well-known quotation and the title of one of Dobzhansky's works: Nothing in Biology Makes Sense Except in the Light of Evolution. Vetulani was close to the philosophy of utilitarianism of John Stuart Mill; he said: "Moral is what serves to increase the happiness of mankind. There is only one problem – unfortunately we have no way of summing up that happiness". He was a fan of fantasy and science fiction literature, and especially of authors such as Ursula K. Le Guin, Isaac Asimov, J. R. R. Tolkien and George R. R. Martin. As his motto he adopted a phrase from Asimov's Foundation: "May your moral sense never lead you to make a wrong decision".

Selected works

Original research papers

Monographs and booklets 
 1964: Półprzewodniki organiczne (co-authors: Krzysztof Pigoń, Kazimierz Gumiński, Wydawnictwa Naukowo-Techniczne)
 1996: Teoria a praktyka leczenia depresji (editor, published by Jagiellonian University Collegium Medicum)
 2006: Narkotyki bez dydaktyki (free supplement to the weekly "Polityka")
 2012: Farmakoterapia depresji – współczesne podstawy teoretyczne i doświadczenia kliniczne (editor, with Janusz Heitzman, published by Termedia)

Popular science books 
 1985: Dzień dzisiejszy i jutro neurobiologii (Ossolineum)
 1993: Jak usprawnić pamięć (Wydawnictwo Platan)
The book was reissued twice (in 1995 and 1998). Sławomir Zagórski, a journalist of Gazeta Wyborcza, in a review of the book called it a page-turner. Małgorzata Czartoszewska of journal Życie Warszawy pointed its "usefulness and universality".
 2010: Mózg: fascynacje, problemy, tajemnice (Wydawnictwo Homini, edited by Krzysztof Bielawski) – Kraków Book of the Month Award (January 2011)
 2011: Piękno neurobiologii (Wydawnictwo Homini)
The book was published as a continuation of Mózg: fascynacje, problemy, tajemnice and contains mainly commentaries and interviews distributed in the media; apart from the scientific subjects, there are threads about the biography of the author. The title was taken from both the Vetulani blog and the interview conducted by Maria de Hernandez Paluch for the monthly Kraków. Sławomir Zagórski described in Gazeta Wyborcza the two books published by Homini as "extremely interesting".
 2015: Bez ograniczeń. Jak rządzi nami mózg (with Maria Mazurek, PWN)
 2016: A w konopiach strach (with Maria Mazurek, PWN)
 2017: Sen Alicji, czyli jak działa mózg (with Maria Mazurek, WAM Publishing House, posthumous edition)
Literally translated as Alice's Dream, or How the Brain Works, a book for children awarded the "Wise Book of the Year" Award for the best popular science book of 2017 in two categories: award from the Jagiellonian University academic community and the Euclid Foundation for the Advancement of Science, and the online audience award. The book became a bestseller in Poland, selling until October 2018 in more than forty thousand copies. The Czech translation of the book was published on October 25, 2018, and translations into Russian, German and French were also started.
 2018: Neoroerotyka. Rozmowy o seksie i nie tylko (with Maria Mazurek, Znak, posthumous edition)

Interviews 
 2015: Mózg i błazen (interviewed by Marcin Rotkiewicz, published by Wydawnictwo Czarne)
 2017: Ćwiczenia duszy, rozciąganie mózgu (in conversation with a Catholic priest Grzegorz Strzelczyk, edited by Michał Jędrzejek, published by Znak)

Translations 
 2010: Carlton K. Erickson, The Science of Addiction: From Neurobiology to Treatment (Polish translation published by Wydawnictwo Uniwersytetu Warszawskiego)

Awards and honors (selection) 
 Awards of the Scientific Secretary of the Polish Academy of Sciences (team, 1972, 1977);
 Awards of the Faculty of Medicine of the Polish Academy of Sciences (as team leader, 1982, 1986, 1992);
 Gold Badge of the Copernicus Polish Society of Naturalists (1986);
 International Anna-Monika Prize (2nd class, 1983);
 Gold badge of the Polish Copernicus Society of Naturalists (1986);
 an honorary member of the Indian Academy of Neurosciences (1988);
 Gold Cross of Merit (1990);
 Nicolaus Copernicus Scientific Award (1996);
 an honorary member of the Polish Copernicus Society of Naturalists (1996);
 Jerzy Konorski Award (2001);
 Prime Minister of Poland Award for the entirety of his scientific achievements (2003);
 Knight's Cross of Polonia Restituta (2004);
 Honoris causa degree from the Medical University of Silesia (2004);
 Jędrzej Śniadecki Medal for the entirety of his research in the field of psychopharmacology (2006);
 an honorary member of Polish Neuroscience Society (2007);
 Honoris causa degree from the Medical University of Łódź (2008);
 Honoris Gratia badge from the mayor of the Royal Capital City of Kraków (2009);
 Kraków Book of the Month (January 2011);
 Zbyszek Thielle Award from Polish Drug Policy Network "for uncompromising support with his scientific authority for the efforts to humanize Polish drug policy, for attitude of deep understanding of the problems of people who use and depend on psychoactive substances, for work and activities for the introduction of medical cannabis and the defense of the civil rights of its users" (2011);
 Rationalist of the Year from Polish Rationalists Society (2012);
 Special Award for in the competition "Science Popularizer" organised by PAP and the Ministry of Science and Higher Education the entirety of his popular work; justification stated that the scientist "brings to the reader not only the latest findings of neuroscientists, but also the socially important conclusions of these studies" (2012);
 Gazeta Krakowska Man of the Year (2014);
 Medal for Long Marital Life (2014);
 Starost of Gorlice Award (2016);
 Honorary Fellow of the Oxford Neurological Society (2017).

Family tree

References

Bibliography

External links 

 Piękno neurobiologii blog 

1936 births
2017 deaths
Polish biochemists
Polish neuroscientists
Polish pharmacologists
Members of the Polish Academy of Sciences
Members of the Polish Academy of Learning
Polish editors
Physicians from Kraków
Knights of the Order of Polonia Restituta
Recipients of the Gold Cross of Merit (Poland)
Jagiellonian University alumni
Academic staff of Jagiellonian University
Vanderbilt University faculty
Polish bloggers
Male bloggers
Polish people of Italian descent
Polish atheists
Solidarity (Polish trade union) activists
Science communicators